Benzomorphan is a chemical compound that is the  base for a series of drugs which variably act on the opioid kappa and sigma receptors, including the following compounds:

 5,9-DEHB
8-CAC
 Alazocine
 Anazocine
 Bremazocine
 Butinazocine
 Carbazocine
 Cogazocine
 Cyclazocine
 Dezocine
 Eptazocine
 Etazocine
 Ethylketocyclazocine
 Fluorophen
 Gemazocine
 Ibazocine
 Ketazocine
 Metazocine
 Moxazocine
 Pentazocine
 Phenazocine
 Quadazocine
 Thiazocine
 Tonazocine
 Volazocine
 Zenazocine

Some of these agents are used as analgesics, including pentazocine, phenazocine, dezocine, and eptazocine.

See also 
 Benzazocine
 Azocine
 Morphinan

References 

Benzomorphans